Matthew Anderson (March 9, 1822April 22, 1910) was an Irish American immigrant, businessman, and famous Democratic politician.  He served four years in the Wisconsin State Senate and one year in the State Assembly, representing western Dane County.  Earlier in life, he served as mayor of Bellefontaine, Ohio.

Early life
Anderson was born to George and Jane Anderson on March 9, 1822, in County Londonderry, Ireland.

Career
Anderson owned shoe shops in Lancaster County, Pennsylvania, and Bellefontaine, Ohio. He served as the mayor of Bellefontaine in 1851 and was a council member there. He then moved to Cross Plains, Wisconsin, in 1860, where he owned a farm.

Anderson was a member of the Wisconsin State Assembly in 1871 before being elected to the Wisconsin State Senate in 1877 and 1879, serving until 1881. In addition, he was chairman of the Township Board of Cross Plains. He was a Democrat.

Personal life 
On June 22, 1847, Anderson married Elizabeth C. Harner. They had six children before her death on March 30, 1880. Anderson later married Harriet Arland on March 8, 1882.

Anderson died of old age in his home in Mount Horeb, Wisconsin, and was buried in Bellefontaine, Ohio.

References

External links

Politicians from County Londonderry
Irish emigrants to the United States (before 1923)
People from Lancaster County, Pennsylvania
People from Bellefontaine, Ohio
People from Mount Horeb, Wisconsin
Democratic Party Wisconsin state senators
Mayors of places in Wisconsin
Mayors of places in Ohio
Wisconsin city council members
Ohio Democrats
Farmers from Wisconsin
Shoemakers
1822 births
1910 deaths
Democratic Party members of the Wisconsin State Assembly